Eva Horváthová (née Eva Mitterpachová, born 29 December 1974) is a Slovak physician and politician. She has served as a Member of the National Council for the Ordinary People and Independent Personalities party since 2012.

Horváthová teaches at the Slovak Medical University.

Horváthová is married and has three children.

References 

1974 births
Living people
OĽaNO politicians
Members of the National Council (Slovakia) 2012-2016
Members of the National Council (Slovakia) 2016-2020
Members of the National Council (Slovakia) 2020-present
Female members of the National Council (Slovakia)